Michael Hurley (born December 20, 1941) is an American folk singer-songwriter who was essential to the Greenwich Village folk music scene of the 1960s and 1970s. In addition to playing a wide variety of instruments, Hurley is also a cartoonist and a painter.

Hurley's music has been described as "outsider folk".

Career
He was born in Bucks County, Pennsylvania, United States. Before starting his recording career Hurley contracted mononucleosis and needed to wait several years until he could sign to a record label. Hurley's debut album, First Songs, was recorded for Folkways Records in 1963, on the same reel-to-reel machine that taped Lead Belly's Last Sessions. He was discovered by blues and jazz historian Frederick Ramsey III, and subsequently championed by boyhood friend Jesse Colin Young, who released his second and third albums on The Youngbloods' Warner Bros. imprint, Raccoon. In the late 1970s, Hurley made three albums for Rounder, all of which have since been reissued on CD. His 1976 LP Have Moicy!, a collaboration with the Holy Modal Rounders and Jeffrey Frederick & The Clamtones, was named "the greatest folk album of the rock era" by The Village Voice Robert Christgau.

In 1996, Koch Records released Wolfways with Hurley backed by Mickey Bones on drums. Tours with Son Volt and high praise from younger performers like Lucinda Williams, Vic Chesnutt, Woods, Calexico, Cat Power, Julian Lynch, and Robin Holcomb followed.

In 2001, Locust Music reissued Hurley's debut under the new title Blueberry Wine, with new artwork contributed by Hurley.

Gnomonsong released a new Michael Hurley album titled Ancestral Swamp on September 18, 2007. Backing was provided by longtime Hurley associate David Reisch of the Holy Modal Rounders and new friends Tara Jane O'Neil and Lewi Longmire.

In 2010, Secret Seven Records (San Francisco) and Mississippi Records (Portland) teamed up to reissue 100 copies of Hurley's rarest album, Blue Navigator, on 8-track tape. (Hurley is a long-time collector of music on 8-track tapes.)

In 2011, Hurley's first book of lyrics was released by the Quebec book publisher L'Oie de Cravan. It contains the original English lyrics to 19 of his songs calligraphed by the author, a foreword by critic Byron Coley and a French version by Marie Frankland, winner of the 2007 John-Glassco prize for translation.

Hurley performed at the annual Nelsonville Music Festival in 2008 and 2010–2019, and again in 2022.

His song, "Hog of the Forsaken", was used in the closing credits for the pilot episode of the series and the closing of Deadwood: The Movie.

Hurley appears in the Oregon-set family drama film Leave No Trace (2018), where he performs "O My Stars" at a bonfire alongside fellow Oregon-based musician Marisa Anderson.

He currently lives in rural northwest Oregon and performs frequently in and around Portland.

In 2021 Hurley released a new album titled The Time of the Foxgloves. The New Yorker's Amanda Petrusich included it in her 10 best albums of the year list.

Personal life
Michael Hurley grew up in Bucks County, Pennsylvania, and began playing and writing songs at the age of 13. He recorded his first album, First Songs at the age of 22. He also lived in New Jersey, Massachusetts, California, Vermont, Ohio, Florida, and most recently in Oregon.

Hurley self-published at least three magazines. The Underground Monthly, The Outcry, and The Morning Tea. He also created several comic books featuring Jocko and Boone, Greenbriar Kornbread, and Mama Molasses, among other characters.

Hurley likes to call himself Elwood Snock, Doc Snock, Snockman, The Snock, or Snock. Hurley has done much of the artwork for his own albums. Two oft-featured cartoon werewolves, Jocko and Boone, have been something of a theme across Hurley's musical career, even appearing in their own comics. Both are based on dogs that Hurley's family owned when he was a child.

Michael Hurley has three children with his former wife, Marjorie, whom he called "Pasta", two sons, Jacob and Colorado, and a daughter, Daffodil. With a girlfriend, Kim, he shares a son, Rollin. He shares a daughter, Wilder Mountain Honey, with a girlfriend, Bethany.

Discography 
First Songs (1964) FOLKWAYS REC
Armchair Boogie (1971)
Hi Fi Snock Uptown (1972)
Have Moicy! (1975) credited to Michael Hurley/The Unholy Modal Rounders/Jeffrey Frederick & the Clamtones
Long Journey  (1976)
Snockgrass (1980) 
Blue Navigator (1984)
Watertower (1988)
Land Of Lofi And Redbirds (1988)
Excrusiasion '86 (1988)
Growlin' Bo Bo (1991)
The Woodbill Brothers (1992)
Wolfways (1994)
Parsnip Snips (1996)
Bellemeade Sessions (1997)
Weatherhole (1999)
Live in Edinburgh (1999)
Blueberry Wine (2001)
Sweetkorn (2002)
Down in Dublin (2005)
Ancestral Swamp (2007)
Ida Con Snock (2009)
Blue Hills (2010)
First Songs (1964) LP REPRINT (Smithsonian, 2010)
Wildegeeses/South in Virginia 7" (Mississippi Records)
Back Home With Drifting Woods (Mississippi Records/Nero's Neptune Records split release)
Fatboy Spring (Mississippi Records)
Land of LoFi (2013) (Mississippi Records)
Bad Mr. Mike (2016) (Mississippi Records)
Redbirds at Folk City (2017) (Feeding Tube Records)
Living Ljubljana (2018) (Feeding Tube Records)
The Time of the Foxgloves (2021)

References

External links
Official site
Michael Hurley at Gnomonsong Devendra Banhart's & Andy Cabic's label
Michael Hurley at Blue Navigator Fanzine & Record Label
Michael Hurley at Rounder Records

2009 Interview: "The Vermonters Wanted Me to Play Hank Williams: A Conversation with Michael Hurley"
Short Documentary Film on Michael Hurley by filmmaker Marc Israel

1941 births
Living people
American folk singers
American male singer-songwriters
People from Bucks County, Pennsylvania
Singer-songwriters from Pennsylvania
People from Astoria, Oregon
Singer-songwriters from Oregon
Light In The Attic Records artists